Mohammad Afeeq Iqmal bin Rosli (born 1999) is a Malaysian professional footballer who plays as a forward for Kedah Darul Aman.

Career statistics

Club

References

External links
 

1999 births
Living people

Malaysian footballers
Association football forwards
Kedah Darul Aman F.C. players
Malaysia Super League players